Twogether is a 2001 studio album by Bucky Pizzarelli and John Pizzarelli of jazz standards, a particular specialty of the pair. The Victrola Records label is small and independent.

Track listing 
Bing's Blues      
Dinah      
Honeysuckle Rose     
I'm Through With Love/I'll Never Be the Same      
If I Had You      
Indiana      
It Must Be True/Please      
It's Been a Long, Long Time/Don't Take Your Love from Me      
Just One More Chance      
Let's Do It      
Poor Butterfly      
Sweet Georgia Brown      
The Sheik of Araby      
These Foolish Things

Personnel
Bucky Pizzarelliguitar
John Pizzarelliguitar

References

Bucky Pizzarelli albums
John Pizzarelli albums
Collaborative albums
2001 albums